An advice column is a column in a question and answer format. Typically, a (usually anonymous) reader writes to the media outlet with a problem in the form of a question, and the media outlet provides an answer or response.

The responses are written by an advice columnist (colloquially known in British English as an agony aunt, or agony uncle if the columnist is male). An advice columnist is someone who gives advice to people who send in problems to the media outlet. The image presented was originally of an older woman dispensing comforting advice and maternal wisdom, hence the name "aunt". Sometimes the author is in fact a composite or a team: Marjorie Proops's name appeared (with photo) long after she retired. The nominal writer may be a pseudonym, or in effect a brand name; the accompanying picture may bear little resemblance to the actual author.

The Athenian Mercury contained the first known advice column in 1690. Traditionally presented in a magazine or newspaper, an advice column can also be delivered through other news media, such as the internet and broadcast news media.

History

The original advice columns of The Athenian Mercury covered a wide scope of information, answering questions on subjects such as science, history, and politics. John Dunton, the bookseller who established The Athenian Mercury, enlisted experts in different fields to assist with the answers. As more people read the columns, questions on relationships increased.

In 1704, Daniel Defoe began a public affairs journal, A Review of the Affairs of France. He used the name of a fictional society, the "Scandalous Club", as the "author" of a lighter section of the Review, and soon readers were sending 40-50 letters a week asking for advice from the Scandalous Club. At one point, Defoe complained of a backlog of 300 unanswered questions. Eventually, he spun off the letters-and-answers into a separate paper called the Little Review.

A few years after the Little Review ended, The British Apollo newspaper provided advice to readers' questions in London. These have been compiled and published as The British Apollo: containing two thousand answers to curious questions in most arts and sciences, serious, comical, and humorous, approved of by many of the most learned and ingenious of both universities, and of the Royal-Society.

Della Manley, the first recorded woman editor in Britain, began a gossip sheet in 1709, the Female Tattler, which included advice to readers, making her the first Agony Aunt. Her advice column approach was soon mimicked in the Female Spectator, a women's magazine launched by Eliza Haywood.

As Silence Dogood and other characters, Benjamin Franklin offered advice in the New England Courant and later in the Pennsylvania Gazette. The popular columnist Dorothy Dix began her column in 1896. Marie Manning started "Dear Beatrice Fairfax" in 1898. In 1902, George V. Hobart wrote a humorous advice column, "Dinkelspiel Answers Some Letters", in the San Francisco Examiner. In 1906, a column called "A Bintel Brief" ran in the Jewish Daily Forward in New York, which answered questions from new immigrants. From 1941 to her death in 1962, Eleanor Roosevelt wrote an advice column, If You Ask Me, first published in Ladies Home Journal and then later in McCall's. A selection of her columns was compiled in the book If You Ask Me: Essential Advice from Eleanor Roosevelt in 2018.

An unusual advice column that foreshadowed internet forums was "Confidential Chat" in the Boston Globe. Launched in 1922 and published until 2006, readers both asked and answered questions without a columnist as intermediary.

Advice columns proliferated in American newspapers early in the twentieth century as publishers recognized their value in capturing the interest of women, a key advertising demographic.   An advice column for teenagers, "Boy Dates Girl" by Gay Head, started in Scholastic magazine in 1936. Advice columns specifically for teens became more common in the 1950s, such as "Ask Beth" which began in the Boston Globe and was then syndicated to 50 papers. 

More recently, advice columns have been written by experts in specific fields. One example is  sex therapist Dr. Ruth Westheimer, writing for Ask Dr. Ruth.

Unlike the broad variety of questions in the earlier columns, modern advice columns tended to focus on personal questions about relationships, morals, and etiquette. However, despite the perception that sex was not a topic in advice columns early in the twentieth century, questions about sexual behavior, practices, and expectations were addressed in advice columns as early as the 1920s, although not in the explicit manner that can be found today.

Many advice columns are now syndicated and appear in several newspapers. Prominent American examples include Dear Abby, Ann Landers, Carolyn Hax's Tell Me About It, and Daniel Mallory Ortberg's Dear Prudence. In the 1970s, the Chicago Tribune and New York Daily News Syndicate estimated that 65 million people read "Dear Abby" daily. As recently as 2000, both the Ann Landers and "Dear Abby" syndicated columns were published in over 500 newspapers.

Internet sites such as the Elder Wisdom Circle offer relationship advice to a broad audience; Dear Maggie offers sex advice to a predominantly Christian readership in Christianity Magazine, and Miriam's Advice Well offers advice to Jews in Philadelphia. These days, men as advice columnists are rarer than women in print, but men have been appearing more often online in both serious and comedic formats.

Influence on society

Advice columns were not simply informational; from the days of The Athenian Mercury, they contributed to a sense of community in which readers not only learned from others' issues vicariously, but engaged with each other by offering their own answers to questions already published or by challenging advice given by the columnist. David Gudelunas, in his book Confidential to America, said "It was through reading columns such as "Dorothy Dix" and "Ann Landers" that Americans learned what the other half was up to—no matter what half they themselves represented."

When people wrote letters, they were writing not only to the columnist, but also to their peers who would read about their problems. By discussing shared issues, advice columns contribute to a common understanding of mores and communal values. For example, as a community dialog, "A Bintel Brief" provided Eastern European Jewish immigrants with advice on adjusting to American life and helped bridge their disparate national cultures. David Gudelunas states "Newspaper advice columns in the twentieth century are just as much about community discussions as they were in the seventeenth century."

Readers took advantage of the anonymity of letters to advice columns to use it as a confessional. It gave them the opportunity to share information about themselves and their lives that, as many said in their letters, they were "too embarrassed" to tell people they knew. The advice column, with its views into the lives of others, became a tool in ventures as disparate as children's counseling and teaching English as a second language.

A male British columnist felt that his column served several useful purposes: referrals to public services, education, and reassurance. He also noted the cathartic value to the letter writers.

Due their national reach and popularity, advice columns could also be a tool for activism. In the 1980s, Ann Landers wrote an anti-nuclear column and encouraged her readers to clip it and forward it; over 100,000 letters were received by the White House. One million copies of her 1971 column supporting a cancer bill were sent to President Nixon.

In fiction
The "Agony Aunt" has become the subject of fiction, often satirically or farcically. Versions of the form include:

 An agony aunt whose own personal problems and issues are more bizarre than those of her correspondents. A notable example is the British TV sitcom Agony created by Anna Raeburn, starring Maureen Lipman as the agony aunt with an overbearing mother, an unreliable husband, neurotic gay neighbours, and a career in media surrounded by self-promoting bizarros. Anna Raeburn herself works as an agony aunt on radio call-in shows, much as the main character of the sitcom does.
 Mrs. Mills deliberately gives terrible advice to her clients, and is a satire of an agony aunt.
 Another classic example of the agony aunt in fiction appears in Miss Lonelyhearts (1933) by Nathanael West.
 In Evelyn Waugh's novel The Loved One, a Mr. Slump dispenses advice (on one occasion, it is lethal) under the name Guru Brahmin.
 In Terry Pratchett's Discworld series, the Agony Aunts are elderly but violent enforcers for the Seamstress Guild, pausing in their pursuit of offenders only to shop for bargains at rummage sales.
 In The Brady Bunch episode "Dear Libby", the six kids of a blended family see a problem similar to their family is having in an eponymous advice column, and worry their (blended) family may not survive. After all the children also post their questions to the column, the columnist herself visits the family and provides them relief by saying that the person who posted the original question did not come from this family.
 Sherlock Holmes regularly consulted the "agony columns" of a number of newspapers, although at that time they seem to have been what we would call personal classified ads. In His Last Bow, "He took down the great book in which, day by day, he filed the agony columns of the various London journals." In The Adventure of the Three Garridebs, "I should have thought, sir, that your obvious way was to advertise in the agony columns of the papers."
 The pilot episode of  Drake and Josh has Josh play an advice columnist named Miss Nancy.

Listing of columnists

American advice columnists

British advice columnists

Advice columnists in fiction
 Phoebe Halliwell, television series Charmed
 Miss Lonelyhearts (1933), novel
 Mrs. Mills Solves all Your Problems,The Sunday Times Style magazine
 Jane Lucas in the British sitcom Agony (1979-81), played by Maureen Lipman
 Straight Talk (1992), a film featuring Dolly Parton as an agony aunt

See also 

 Islamic advice literature
 Responsa

Notes

References

External links
The British Apollo

1690s introductions
Newspaper content